Eric Helland (born c. 1968) is the William F. Podlich Professor of Economics in Robert Day School of Economics and Finance at Claremont McKenna College and Claremont Graduate University, George R. Roberts Fellow at Claremont McKenna College, and Senior Economist, Institute for Civil Justice, RAND Corporation, Santa Monica, CA.

Helland holds a B.A. (1991) from the University of Missouri and an M.A (1992) and Ph.D. in Economics from Washington University in St. Louis (1995). Helland is a member of the Board of Directors of the UCLA Center for Governance. He is the recipient of the Robert H. Durr Award from the Midwest Political Science Association and the Dean's Teaching Award from Ball State University. He has been Senior Economist at the  Council of Economic Advisors and Visiting Professor of Economics at the Stigler Center for the Study of the Economy and the State at the University of Chicago. From 2003 to 2004 he worked as the Senior Staff Economist on the Council of Economic Advisers.

He holds professional associations with American Economic Association, Society for Empirical Legal Studies, and the American Law and Economics Association. He is an editor-in-chief of the International Review of Law and Economics. His articles have appeared in such scholarly journal as the Journal of Environmental Economics and Management,  Journal of Legal Studies, and Review of Economics and Statistics.

Selected works
 
 
 "Court Congestion as an Explanation for Rising Attorney Fees" (with Jonathan Klick, Journal of Legal Studies 36(1):1-17, 2007)

References

External links
Does Three Strikes Deter? A Nonparametric Estimation by Eric Helland and Alexander Tabarrok
Judge And Jury: American Tort Law On Trial by Eric Helland and Alexander Tabarrok
The Impact of Attorney Compensation on the Timing of Settlements by Eric Helland and Jonathan Klick

1970s births
Living people
Economists from California
American people of Norwegian descent
University of Missouri alumni
Washington University in St. Louis alumni
Ball State University faculty
Claremont McKenna College faculty
Claremont Graduate University faculty
21st-century American economists